Cyperus neokunthianus is a species of sedge that is endemic to Hawaii.

The species was first formally described by the botanist Georg Kükenthal in 1936.

See also
 List of Cyperus species

References

neokunthianus
Flora of Hawaii
Plants described in 1936
Taxa named by Georg Kükenthal